Special stage may refer to:

 Special stage (rallying)
 SS (manga), known alternatively as Special Stage
 Bonus stage